Claudio Tolomei (1492 in Asciano – 1556 in Rome) was an Italian philologist. His name in Italian is identical to that of Claudius Ptolemaeus, the 2nd-century Greek astronomer. He belonged to the prominent Tolomei family of Siena, and became a bishop attached to the court of Pope Paul III.

He was one of those to whom fellow Sienese, Bernardino Ochino, corresponded from exile in Geneva, where he had fled after abandoning his monastic position due to accusations of heresy.

Notes

1492 births
1556 deaths
Italian philologists